Beverley Harper (1941 – 9 August 2002) was an Australian author of novels set in Africa.

Born in Bulli, New South Wales in 1941, Harper visited Africa in 1967. Although she meant to stay for only one year, she lived there until 1988, when she returned to Australia.

Most of her novels were translated into German and published by Bastei Lübbe. Her final novel, Footprints of Lion, was completed by her husband after her death from cancer in 2002. Her ashes lie on the banks of the Boteti River in Botswana.

Works

Novels

German translations

Short stories
 "Unclaimed Melody" in 
 "Festival of Lights" in 
 "Who Wins, Dared" in

References

1941 births
2002 deaths
Australian women novelists
Australian women short story writers
20th-century Australian women writers
20th-century Australian writers
21st-century Australian women writers
21st-century Australian writers
Deaths from cancer

1941 Alabama elections